An energy carrier is a substance (fuel) or sometimes a phenomenon (energy system) that contains energy that can be later converted to other forms such as mechanical work or heat or to operate chemical or physical processes.

Such carriers include springs, electrical batteries, capacitors, pressurized air, dammed water, hydrogen, petroleum, coal, wood, and natural gas. An energy carrier does not produce energy; it simply contains energy imbued by another system.

Definition according to ISO 13600
According to ISO 13600, an energy carrier is either a substance or a phenomenon that can be used to produce mechanical work or heat or to operate chemical or physical processes. It is any system or substance that contains energy for conversion as usable energy later or somewhere else. This could be converted for use in, for example, an appliance or vehicle. Such carriers include springs, electrical batteries, capacitors, pressurized air, dammed water, hydrogen, petroleum, coal, wood, and natural gas.

ISO 13600 series (ISO 13600, ISO 13601, and ISO 13602) are intended to be used as tools to define, describe, analyse and compare technical energy systems (TES) at micro and macro levels:

ISO 13600 (Technical energy systems — Basic concepts) covers basic definitions and terms needed to define and describe TESs in general and TESs of energyware supply and demand sectors in particular.
ISO 13601 (Technical energy systems — Structure for analysis — Energyware supply and demand sectors) covers structures that shall be used to describe and analyse sub-sectors at the macro level of energyware supply and demand
ISO 13602 (all parts) facilitates the description and analysis of any technical energy systems.

Definition within the field of energetics

In the field of energetics, an energy carrier is produced by human technology from a primary energy source. Only the energy sector uses primary energy sources. Other sectors of society use an energy carrier to perform useful activities (end-uses). The distinction between "Energy Carriers" (EC) and "Primary Energy Sources" (PES) is extremely important. An energy carrier can be more valuable (have a higher quality) than a primary energy source. For example 1 megajoule (MJ) of electricity produced by a hydroelectric plant is equivalent to 3 MJ of oil. Sunlight is a main source of primary energy, which can be transformed into plants and then into coal, oil and gas. Solar power and wind power are other derivatives of sunlight. Note that although coal, oil and natural gas are derived from sunlight, they are considered primary energy sources which are extracted from the earth (fossil fuels). Natural uranium is also a primary energy source extracted from the earth but does not come from the decomposition of organisms (mineral fuel).

See also 
 Capital goods
 Coefficient of performance
 Embedded energy
 Energy and society
 Energy crisis
 Energy pay-back
 Energy resource
 Energy source
 Energy storage
 Energyware
 Entropy
 Exergy
 Future energy development
 Hydrogen economy
 ISO 14000
 Liquid nitrogen economy
 Lithium economy
 Methanol economy
 Renewable resource
 Vegetable oil economy
Renewable Energy

References

Further reading 

 European Nuclear Society info pool/glossary: Energy carrier
 Our Energy Futures glossary: Energy Carriers
 Störungsdienst, Elektriker (in German)

External links 
 "Boron: a better energy carrier than hydrogen?" paper by Graham Cowan
 ISO 13600 Technical energy systems -- Basic concepts: gives the basic concepts needed to define and describe technical energy systems.

Energetics
Energy storage
Thermodynamics
Hydrogen production